Luwang Ningthou Punshiba, shortly known as Luwang Punshiba, is a king of the Luwang dynasty of Ancient Manipur (Antique Kangleipak) civilization. He is best known for his long life and outstanding wisdom in Manipuri folklore and history of Manipur.

According to the Hijan Hirao and the Hirol, he is the originator of the Hiyang Tannaba (boat race) with the invention of the Hiyang Hiren (traditional boat).

Some historians opined that Luwang Ningthou Punshiba is the fourth descendant of Poireiton and he has nine wives.
Regarding relationship with the Meitei kings of the Ningthouja dynasty, Punshiba gave training of state craft and the art of governance to Naothingkhong (663 AD-763 AD) when he was a prince. Besides, the great-grandson of Luwang Ningthou Punshiba (from his first wife) married Meitei king Naothingkhong's's daughter.

However, he is also considered as a mythological divine figure in some literary works.

External links 

 https://books.google.co.in/books?id=hiGcAAAAMAAJ&q=luwang+ningthou+punshiba&dq=luwang+ningthou+punshiba&hl=en&sa=X&ved=2ahUKEwiyxfLF_ZzxAhXSxzgGHSutAFgQ6AEwBHoECAwQAw
 https://books.google.co.in/books?id=swxFAAAAYAAJ&q=luwang+punshiba&dq=luwang+punshiba&hl=en&sa=X&ved=2ahUKEwjDiLyP_JzxAhXjxzgGHd4FDx4Q6AEwCHoECAUQAw

References 

History of Manipur
Meitei people
Pages with unreviewed translations
Kings of Ancient Manipur